Coltemonikha (stylized as "COLTEMONIKHA" or "COLTEMÖNIKHA") was a Japanese electronica duo consisting of record producer Yasutaka Nakata and model and fashion designer Kate Sakai.

The group formed as a project uniting music and fashion. They produced two mini-albums which were made to complement Sakai's fashion line "Made in Colkinikha" and one compilation album. Their name was a portmanteau of "Colkinikha" and "contemode".

Members
 Yasutaka Nakata (born 1980 February 6) - composition, arrangement, production
 Kate Sakai (born 1982 November 5) - lyrics, vocals

Musical style
Coltemonikha's music is pop-styled with electronic influences. The lyrics, written by Sakai, generally carry a whimsical mood and often contain a blending of Japanese and English.

Discography

Extended plays

Compilation albums

References

External links
  

Japanese dance music groups
Japanese musical duos
Musical groups established in 2006
Musical groups disestablished in 2011
Japanese electropop groups
Yasutaka Nakata